Fred McLeod Wilcox (December 22, 1907 – September 23, 1964) was an American motion picture director. He worked for Metro-Goldwyn-Mayer for many years best remembered for directing Lassie Come Home (1943) and Forbidden Planet (1956). These films were entered in the National Film Preservation Board's National Film Registry in 1993 and 2013 respectively.

Filmography

 Joaquin Murrieta (1938)
 Lassie Come Home (1943)
 Courage of Lassie (1946)
 Three Daring Daughters (1948)
 Hills of Home (1948)
 The Secret Garden (1949)
 Shadow in the Sky (1952)
 Code Two (1953)
 Tennessee Champ (1954)
 Forbidden Planet (1956)
 I Passed for White (1960)

External links

1907 births
1964 deaths
People from Tazewell, Virginia
Film directors from Virginia
Science fiction film directors